Wenhaston railway station was in Wenhaston, Suffolk.  It closed in 1929, 50 years after it had opened for passenger traffic.  The Southwold Railway Trust has submitted a planning application to reopen this station as a replica of the original, including a half mile of 3 ft gauge track heading towards Blythburgh.  The plan includes enhancing the landscape and environment for the benefit of wildlife, as well as building a suitable visitor centre.

See also
 British narrow gauge railways

References

External links
  Plan for Wenhaston railway station.

Disused railway stations in Suffolk
Former Southwold Railway stations
Railway stations in Great Britain opened in 1879
Railway stations in Great Britain closed in 1929